Gwyneth Alva Challis, known as Alva, (25 January 1930 – 21 November 2010) was a Welsh-born New Zealand geologist who discovered the mineral Wairauite, and pioneered the use of x-rays for mineral investigation in New Zealand.

Life and work 
Challis was born in Port Talbot, Wales, on 25 January 1930. In 1952, she emigrated with her parents to New Zealand, where she worked as a radiographer in Invercargill and Wellington. In 1958, Challis joined the Petrology Section of the New Zealand Geological Survey as a technician. She undertook a master's degree majoring in geology at Victoria University of Wellington, studying part-time, where in 1959 she won the Sir Robert Stout scholarship for best student. Her master's thesis was on the geology of the Mt Lookout area in Marlborough. She later said that one of her supervisors, Harold Wellman, "treated her like an honorary man", such that she was surprised when he brought another lecturer to act as chaperone on a visit to her in the field.

In 1961 Challis won a DSIR scholarship to Cambridge University, where she completed a PhD in geology in 1963, titled The petrology of the New Zealand ultramafic belt. During her PhD Challis used an electron microprobe analyser to determine the composition of very small mineral particles, and in so doing, discovered a new mineral. This was named Wairauite, after the Wairau Valley in Marlborough where Challis found it. Her PhD was the first geoscience doctorate by a New Zealand woman.

Also during her PhD, Challis met socially with one of her geology lecturers from Victoria University of Wellington, Ross Lauder. Lauder and Challis were married in 1963 in Wellington. The couple worked together on deep-seated rock deposits with possible mineral deposits, including the Longwood Range in Southland. In 1965, when the Geological Survey celebrated its centenary, Challis was the only female scientist employed there.

Lauder died in 1979. Challis retired to Motueka in 1995, where she volunteered at the Motueka District Museum.

Challis died in Nelson on 21 November 2010.

Recognition 
In 2017 Challis was selected as one of the Royal Society Te Apārangi's "150 women in 150 words", celebrating the contributions of women to knowledge in New Zealand.

Selected works

References 

1930 births
2010 deaths
20th-century New Zealand geologists
People from Port Talbot
Alumni of the University of Cambridge
Victoria University of Wellington alumni
Welsh emigrants to New Zealand